Nikita Olegovich Lapin (born 20 May 1993) is a Russian football defender.

Club career
He made his debut in the Russian Second Division for FC Zvezda Ryazan on 16 July 2012 in a game against FC Podolye Podolsky district.

He made his Russian Football National League debut for FC Khimki on 11 July 2016 in a game against FC Tosno.

References

External links
 
 
 Career summary by sportbox.ru 
 

1993 births
People from Stary Oskol
Living people
Russian footballers
Russia youth international footballers
Association football defenders
FC Saturn Ramenskoye players
FC Tyumen players
FC Khimki players
FC Lokomotiv Moscow players
FC Baltika Kaliningrad players
FC Volga Ulyanovsk players
Sportspeople from Belgorod Oblast